Nathaniel Currier (March 27, 1813 – November 20, 1888) was an American lithographer. He headed the company Currier & Ives with James Ives.

Early years
Currier was born in Roxbury, Massachusetts, to Nathaniel and Hannah Currier. He attended public school until age fifteen, when he was apprenticed to the Boston printing firm of William and John Pendleton. The Pendletons were the first successful lithographers in the United States, lithography having only recently been invented in Europe. Currier learned the process in their shop. He subsequently went to work for M. E. D. Brown in Philadelphia, in 1833. The following year, Currier moved to New York City, where he was to start a new business with John Pendleton. Pendleton backed out, and the new firm became Currier & Stodart, which lasted only one year.

Currier & Ives
In 1835, Currier started his own lithographic business as an eponymous sole proprietorship. He initially engaged in standard lithographic business of printing sheet music, letterheads, handbills, etc. 

However, he soon took his work in a new direction, creating pictures of current events. In late 1835, he issued a print illustrating a recent fire in New York. Ruins of the Merchant's Exchange N.Y. after the Destructive Conflagration of Decbr 16 & 17, 1835 was published by the New York Sun, just four days after the fire, and was an early example of illustrated news. In 1840, Currier began to move away from job printing and into independent print publishing. In that year, the Sun published his print Awful Conflagration of the Steam Boat 'Lexington' in Long Island Sound on Monday Eveg Jany 13th 1840, by Which Melancholy Occurrence Over 100 Persons Perished, another documentation of a news event, three days after the disaster; the print sold thousands of copies.

In 1850, James Ives came to work for Currier's firm as bookkeeper. Ives' skills as a businessman and marketer contributed significantly to the growth of the company; in 1857 he was made a full partner, and the company became known as Currier & Ives.  

Currier & Ives are best known as creators of popular art prints, such as Christmas scenes, landscapes, or depictions of Victorian urban sophistication; however, the firm also produced political cartoons and banners, significant historical scenes, and further illustrations of current events. Over the decades, the firm created roughly 7,500 images.

Currier retired from his firm in 1880, and turned the business over to his son Edward.

Personal life and death
Currier married Eliza West Farnsworth in 1840. The couple had one child, Edward West Currier, the next year. Eliza died in 1843. In 1847, Currier married Lura Ormsbee.

In addition to being a lithographer, he was also a New York City volunteer fireman in the 1850s. 

He was a Unitarian.

Currier was a friend of P.T. Barnum of Barnum and Bailey fame.

Currier was fond of fast horses. He kept several at his Massachusetts residence in a barn he purchased, ordered dismantled, and had delivered by horse to his estate.

He died eight years after retiring, on November 20, 1888, at his home on Lion's Mouth Road in Amesbury, Massachusetts. He is interred at Green-Wood Cemetery in Brooklyn, New York.

Gallery

References

External links 

 The Currier & Ives Foundation
 Green-Wood Cemetery Burial Search

1813 births
1888 deaths
Burials at Green-Wood Cemetery
American Unitarians
American lithographers
People from Roxbury, Boston
People from Amesbury, Massachusetts